Broughton Gifford Halt was a small railway station serving Broughton Gifford in Wiltshire, England, opened in 1905 for the newly introduced steam railcar service between  and .

The halt was southeast of the village at the Mill Lane bridge, near the road between Melksham and Bradford-on-Avon; it was closed in 1955 but the line remains open.

References 

 

Disused railway stations in Wiltshire
Former Great Western Railway stations
Railway stations in Great Britain opened in 1905
Railway stations in Great Britain closed in 1955